Păuleasca may refer to the following places in Romania:

 Păuleasca, a village in Mălureni Commune, Argeș County
 Păuleasca, a village in Micești Commune, Argeș County
 Păuleasca, a village in Frumoasa Commune, Teleorman County
 Păuleasca, a tributary of the Miniș in Caraș-Severin County
 Păuleasca, another name for the river Micești in Argeș County

See also 
 Păuleni (disambiguation)
 Păulești (disambiguation)